"Bird in Flight" is a song by the English new wave band Toyah, fronted by Toyah Willcox, released as a single in 1980 by Safari Records.

Background
The song was written by Toyah Willcox, Charlie Francis, Joel Bogen, Peter Bush and Steve Bray, and was produced by Matt Dangerfield. Willcox explained that it is "a song of rebellion and getting personal freedom, and not being met with negativity for something you passionately believe", revealing that she wrote it in rebellion against her mother. In 2011, the singer reflected: "I find the lyric excruciatingly wrong. But that might be because I'm older and wiser and prefer what I write today. That said, the Toyah band play it beautifully and they have given it a light, optimistic feel that really lifts the whole set. It dances into the venue and tickles your ears. I just need to ignore the lyric... It's so bloody wrong".

In the UK, "Bird in Flight" was released as a double A-side single with the song "Tribal Look", inspired by the Maasai tribe. Toyah promoted the single with the eponymous UK tour from January to March 1980. NME gave "Bird in Flight" a positive review, describing it as a Patti Smith-influenced "good pop song" with a "desirable spacy atmosphere". Neither track was featured on an album at the time, though both were added to the 2002 reissue of Sheep Farming in Barnet, and also on the 2005 compilation album The Safari Singles Collection Part 1: 1979–1981.

Track listing
 7" single
A. "Bird in Flight" (Toyah Willcox, Charlie Francis, Joel Bogen, Peter Bush, Steve Bray) – 3:59
B. "Tribal Look" (Willcox, Francis, Bogen, Bush, Bray) – 3:22

Personnel
 Toyah Willcox – vocals
 Joel Bogen – guitar
 Charlie Francis – bass
 Steve Bray – drums
 Peter Bush – keyboards

Charts

References

External links
 Lyrics of this song at Genius
 Official audio stream on YouTube
 The official Toyah website

1980 singles
1980 songs
Toyah (band) songs
Songs written by Toyah Willcox
Songs written by Joel Bogen
Safari Records singles